Eugene Paul Sculatti (born January 30, 1947) is an American music journalist who compiled and edited the book The Catalog of Cool (1982). In 1966, he became the first journalist to write about the nascent San Francisco music scene in a national magazine (Crawdaddy!). He is formerly an editorial director for Warner Bros. Records and the magazine Billboard. He has also written for Rolling Stone, Creem, and Radio & Records.

References

1947 births
Living people
People from San Francisco
American music critics
Rolling Stone people
American magazine editors
American publicists